Gunnars saga Keldugnúpsfífls ( ) is one of the sagas of Icelanders. It is a late saga composed in the 15th or 16th century. It survives in 17th-century manuscripts.

The saga takes place in Norway and Iceland in the latter part of the 9th century. It is about two brothers, Gunnar and Helge.
Growing up in Keldugnúp , Gunnar was considered to be a fool (fífl ). Gunnar and Helge make a trip to Norway. Here, Gunnar defeats one of the men of Haakon Jarl (Håkon Sigurdsson). Gunnar later returns to Iceland and marries.

References

Other sources
Vidar Hreinsson, ed.  (1997) The Complete Sagas of Icelanders (Reykjavík: Leifur Eiriksson Publishing. translator: Sarah M. Anderson)

External links
Full text at the Icelandic Saga Database
Full text at heimskringla.no in Old Norse

Sagas of Icelanders